Nazariy Rusyn (born 25 October 1998) is a Ukrainian professional footballer who plays as a forward for Zorya Luhansk.

Career
Born in Novoyavorivsk, Rusyn is a product of the FC Lviv and Dynamo Kyiv youth sportive school systems. His first trainer was Yuriy Triska.

He played for FC Dynamo in the Ukrainian Premier League Reserves and in November 2017 he was promoted to the senior squad team. Rusyn made his debut for the Dynamo's senior squad in a match against Albanian KF Skënderbeu Korçë in the 2017–18 UEFA Europa League on 23 November 2017 and scored on 90'+1 minute.

Also he made his debut in the Ukrainian Premier League for Dynamo Kyiv on 26 November 2017, playing in a winning match against FC Stal Kamianske.

As a player of Zorya Luhansk on loan from Dynamo in September 2019 Rusyn was recognized as a player of the month in the Ukrainian Premier League.

On February 23, 2021, Rusyn moved to Polish club Legia Warsaw, on a loan deal until December 2021. The deal included an option to buy. On March 3, 2021, he made his debut for Legia in a Polish Cup's 2–1 defeat against Piast Gliwice at the Stadion Wojska Polskiego. On April 6, 2021, Nazarij Rusyn was moved to the Legia Warsaw reserve team for two weeks.

Career statistics

References

External links 
 
 
 
 

1998 births
Living people
People from Novoyavorivsk
Ukrainian footballers
Ukraine youth international footballers
Ukraine under-21 international footballers
Association football forwards
FC Dynamo Kyiv players
FC Zorya Luhansk players
Legia Warsaw players
SC Dnipro-1 players
FC Chornomorets Odesa players
Ukrainian Premier League players
Ukrainian expatriate footballers
Expatriate footballers in Poland
Ukrainian expatriate sportspeople in Poland
Sportspeople from Lviv Oblast